Jody David Armour is an American academic. He is the Roy P. Crocker Professor of Law at the University of Southern California, where he specializes in race issues in legal decision-making.

Life and career
Armour came to study law after his father was set up and imprisoned when Armour was 8 years old.

Armour graduated from Harvard University and the UC Berkeley School of Law.

He also teaches torts, criminal law, and criminal procedure.

Selected publications
 Negrophobia and Reasonable Racism: The Hidden Costs of Being Black in America, New York University Press, 1997. ,

References

External links
Official website
Article in the USC Gould journal (2021) 

African-American academics
African-American legal scholars
American legal scholars
USC Gould School of Law faculty
UC Berkeley School of Law alumni
Harvard University alumni
21st-century African-American people
Living people
Year of birth missing (living people)